The Battle of Río Salado also known as the Battle of Tarifa (30 October 1340) was a battle of the armies of King Afonso IV of Portugal and King Alfonso XI of Castile against those of Sultan Abu al-Hasan 'Ali of the Marinid dynasty and Yusuf I of Granada.

Campaign
After Alfonso XI of Castile's victory in the Teba campaign of 1330, Muhammed IV, Sultan of Granada sent to Abu al-Hasan 'Ali for help in maintaining his survival. The policies of the Kingdom of Fez vis-à-avis the Iberian Peninsula had changed upon the ascension to power of Hasan in 1331. During his rule the Marinids achieved their largest territorial expansion in Africa. Hasan sent a naval fleet and 5,000 troops that landed at Algeciras in early 1333. These set about helping the Granadan King to capture the Castilian outpost of Gibraltar, which he did after less than two months. They then conducted a limited campaign to reunite these territories to the realm of Granada. Back in Magreb, Abu Hasan amassed his biggest army to undertake an invasion of Castile with the intention of undoing the previous century's Christian advances.

This invasion was a final attempt by the Marinids to set up a power base in the Iberian Peninsula. The Marinids had mobilised a vast army and, after crossing the Strait of Gibraltar and defeating a Christian fleet at Gibraltar, proceeded inland to the Salado River near Tarifa, where they met the Christians.

Preliminary moves
During the winter of 1340, Abu Hasan gathered his fleet: 60 war galleys and 250 other ships concentrated at Ceuta under command of Muhammad ibn Ali al-Azafi. They landed an army at Gibraltar, and on 8 April 1340 44 Muslim galleys and 35 leños met the Castilian fleet of 44 galleys and 7 naos, under Admiral Alfonso Jofre de Tenorio, in the straits. Al-Azafi surrounded and destroyed the Castilian fleet; Tenorio himself lost his life, 28 galleys and seven naos were captured and only 11 of his galleys managed to reach Cartagena. Five reached Tarifa.

Abu Hasan crossed the Gibraltar straits on 14 August 1340, and all through the summer troops and supplies were ferried across to the Peninsula. On 22 September the siege of Tarifa was formally established, with the help of Yusuf I. However the Sultan made a serious mistake: believing it would take many months for the Castilians to rebuild a fleet, and in the hope of cutting down the enormous cost of maintaining his own fleet, Abu Hasan prematurely laid up most of his galleys and returned those of his allies, leaving only 12 at Algeciras.

Meanwhile, Alfonso XI had sought the aid of the King of Aragón and of his father-in-law, King Afonso IV of Portugal. The latter sent a Portuguese naval fleet led by Manuel Pessanha, Admiral of Portugal, and additionally paid for the services of 15 Genoese galleys led by commander Micer Gil Bocanegra. With the addition of 27 ships hastily completed at Seville, the Christian fleets appeared in force in the Straits in October, cutting off the supply routes between Morocco and the Peninsula.

Abu Hasan's position was now a difficult one, not only because the troops besieging Tarifa depended on supplies from Morocco, but also the Kingdom of Granada needed them, their forces having launched a series of limited attacks all along the frontier to hold the Castilians at bay. On 10 October, a severe storm wrecked 12 Castilian galleys, and the same day the Sultan launched an all-out assault against Tarifa, which was barely repulsed with heavy losses on both sides.

Alfonso XI left Seville on 15 October 1340 with a relief army, joining the King of Portugal the next day. They advanced to the line of the Guadalete River and there awaited further Castilian and Portuguese contingents. At last on 26 October the combined army, now 20,000-strong, crossed into enemy territory. When informed of their advance, Abu Hasan ordered the siege raised and his army took position on a hill between Tarifa and the sea. Yusuf I placed his army on an adjacent hill. On the 29th the Christian army reached the Deer Hill (Hayar al-Ayyal),  from Tarifa and barely 250 metres from the beach. Between them and their adversaries was a 4,500m long valley crossed by the streams of La Jara and El Salado. With supplies running low, Alfonso XI decided to attack the next day.

During the night, Alfonso XI had sent 1,000 horse and 4,000 foot troops to reinforce the Tarifa garrison, hoping to surprise the enemy rearguard during the battle; they had met only slight resistance by the 3,000 light cavalry covering the Salado and reached Tarifa without difficulty. However, the officer commanding the light cavalry informed Abu Hasan that not a single Christian had managed to enter Tarifa during the night; whether he made his report in good faith, or in fear of admitting failure will never be known, but this omission had serious consequences the next day.

Opposing forces
A Spanish contemporary chronicle estimated Abu Hasan's army at 40,000 knights and 400,000 infantry; figures regarded as grossly inflated by the historian Joseph O'Callaghan. Another account put forth 53,000 knights and 600,000 infantry for the Moors. A third chronicler postulated 70,000 knights and 400,000 infantry for the Marinids and 7,000 knights and 700,000 infantry for Granada. Archbishop Gil de Albornoz asserted a strength of 40,000 knights and 400,000 infantry for the combined Muslim force. The lowest figure is provided by Rodrigo Yánez's account, claiming that Abu Hasan deployed 60,000 men and that transporting the force across the Straits of Gibraltar took four months. Yánez's estimate is dismissed by O'Callaghan. The 17th century historian Ahmed Mohammed al-Maqqari, relying on an earlier text, also estimated 60,000 men as Abu Hasan's force. Granada had 7,000 knights and the Marinids may have mobilized up to 60,000 men. A Christian militia probably fought for the Emir of Granada at the battle. One Marinid prince fought on the Castilian side.

The Castilians mustered 8,000 knights and 12,000 infantry. The Portuguese brought 1,000 knights and Tarifa kept a garrison of 1,000 men, who took part in the battle. Alfonso sent 3,000 Castilian knights to help the 1,000 Portuguese knights attack Yusuf's 7,000 Granadan knights on the left. The Castilian infantry consisted of municipal militias, stationed in the middle, and soldiers from Asturias and the Basque territories, who were armed and equipped with lances, crossbows, helmets, and shields and were located next to Afonso IV's knights.

The battle
The council of war decided that the Castilian King would attack the Sultan's main army, while the Portuguese host, reinforced by 3,000 Castilians, would engage Yusuf I. At nine o'clock on the morning of 30 October 1340 they moved out of camp, leaving 2,000 raw militia to guard it. The strong Castilian vanguard was led by the Lara brothers, while the King himself rode in the main body. On the left were the missile troops from the Kingdom of León, led by Pedro Nuñez, and on the right Alvar Pérez de Guzmán with a cavalry corps. Reinforcing the Portuguese forces were the Military Orders of Alcántara and Calatrava.

Abu Hasan had left the Jara crossing uncontested, but he deployed strong forces along the Salado. The Castilian vanguard met serious resistance; de Lara was unable to cross the shallow river, but the King's natural sons Fernando and Fadrique led an 800-knight detachment towards the right and captured a small bridge, pushing back the 2,500 cavalry defending it. Alfonso reinforced them with 1,500 more knights and the Salado was successfully crossed.

In the center, Juan Núñez de Lara and the Military Order of Santiago with 3,000 knights finally smashed through the enemy line and crossed too, riding hard up the hill where Abu Hasan's camp was clearly visible. The forces hidden in Tarifa also attacked the Sultan's camp at the same time, and the troops defending it (about 3,000 horse and 8,000 foot) withdrew, half of them fleeing towards Algeciras and the other half joining the main struggle in the valley, where the Sultan's army was still largely intact.

Alfonso now found himself dangerously isolated, with the right wing at some distance and the vanguard attacking the enemy camp. Abu Hasan ordered a general attack and the Castilian King himself was about to engage in hand-to-hand combat when the Archbishop of Toledo, Gil Álvarez Carrillo de Albornoz, grabbed his reins and prevented it. The timely arrival of the Castilian rearguard balanced the situation, and when the forces which had been sacking the Sultan's camp advanced down the hill and engaged the enemy from the rear, Abu Hasan's surrounded army broke and fled towards Algeciras.

Meanwhile, the Portuguese contingent had crossed the Salado, and when Pedro Nuñez reinforced them the whole Granada contingent broke and left the field. The battle took just three hours from 9 a.m. until noon.

The pursuit was ruthless, ending at the Guadamecí River, 6 km from the battlefield, although many remained in the hills, sacking the Sultan's rich camp. Little mercy was shown here, and many of the Sultan's wives were killed, including his first wife Fatimah (daughter of the Sultan of Tunis) and Aysa (daughter of the noble Abu Yahya ibn Yaqub). Other kinfolk of Abu Hasan were taken captive, including his sister Umalfat, his son Abu Umar Tasufin, and his nephew Alí. Many notables were killed in the battle or the rout, such as Abu Tabit ibn Fath Allah, Abu Muyahid Gazi ibn al-Ka's, and Muhammad ben Yahya ben Abi Bakr, also the famous writer from Granada, Abdullah ben Salmun, and the popular imam Ibn al-Khatib.

Both Abu Hasan and Yusuf reached Algeciras; the Sultan took refuge at Gibraltar, and that same night crossed to Ceuta in a galley.

Aftermath
The Marinids had suffered a decisive defeat and moved back to Africa.

Never again was a Muslim army able to invade the Iberian Peninsula. Control of the Straits of Gibraltar was now held by the Christians, specifically the Castilians and the Genoese. The war with Granada continued for ten more years during which Alfonso XI made a few small territorial gains from the western part of Granada. Most importantly, the town of Algeciras, a valuable bridgehead held by the Marinids was finally retaken after a two-year siege in 1344. This siege attracted volunteers from all over Europe due to extensive publicity. An attempt to recapture Gibraltar from the King of Granada was frustrated, however Castile had to settle for isolation of the citadel from the rest of Muslim territory when peace was agreed in 1350, after the death of Alfonso XI in his camp during the Great Plague. Gibraltar was not captured until 1462.

Notes

References

Sources

Further reading

Tarifa
1340 in Europe
14th century in Al-Andalus
Conflicts in 1340
Rio Salado 1340
Rio Salado 1340
Rio Salado 1340
Rio Salado
Rio Salado 1340
Rio Salado 1340
14th century in Castile
14th century in Portugal